The Second Coming generally refers to the Christian belief that Jesus Christ will return to earth.

Second Coming may also refer to:

In religion
 Second Coming (LDS Church), beliefs specific to the Church of Jesus Christ of Latter-day Saints
 The Second Coming or The Next Master of the Aetherius Society

In art, media, and entertainment

Film
 The Second Coming (1992 film), a film starring Blair Underwood
Second Coming (film), a 2014 film directed by debbie tucker green
The Second Coming (2014 film), directed by Herman Yau

Literature

 The Second Coming (Masterson novel), a 2000 novel by Andrew Masterson
 The Second Coming (Percy novel), a 1980 novel by Walker Percy
 "The Second Coming" (poem), a 1920 poem by William Butler Yeats
 'Salem's Lot or Second Coming, a 1975 novel by Stephen King
 The Second Coming: A Leatherdyke Reader, a book edited by Patrick Califia and Robin Sweeney
 The Second Coming: A Love Story, a 2014 novel by Scott Pinsker

Comics 

 X-Men: Second Coming, a 2010 crossover storyline published by Marvel Comics
 Second Coming, a 2019 comic book series created by Mark Russell and Richard Pace

Music
 Second Coming (band), a band from the Seattle area

Albums

 2nd Coming (Mr. Del album), 2000
 Second Coming (The Stone Roses album), 1994
 Second Coming (Second Coming album), 1998
 Second Coming (Dickies album), 1989
 Second Coming (Shotgun Messiah album), 1991
 Second Coming (Stryper album), 2013
 The Second Coming (Adina Howard album), 2004
 The Second Coming (Little Richard album), 1972
 The Second Coming (Kiss video), 1998
 The Second Coming (TQ album), 2000
 The Second Coming (Church of Misery album), 2004
 Ghost Opera: The Second Coming, a reissue of Ghost Opera by Kamelot

Songs
 "Second Coming", a song by Alice Cooper on the album Love It to Death (1971)
 "The Second Coming", a track by Whitehouse from Birthdeath Experience (1980)
 "The Second Coming", a song by Juelz Santana

Television
 "The Second Coming" (Heroes), a 2008 episode of the NBC TV drama Heroes
 "The Second Coming" (The Sopranos), an episode of the American television series The Sopranos
 The Second Coming (TV serial), a British television drama starring Christopher Eccleston
 Battlestar Galactica: The Second Coming, a 1999 movie pilot for a proposed Battlestar Galactica TV series that never aired

See also
 Broly: Second Coming, a Dragon Ball Z movie
 The Second Coming of Steve Jobs, a 2000 biography of the Apple, Inc. founder